Désiré Tsarahazana (born 13 June 1954) is a Malagasy prelate of the Catholic Church. He has been Archbishop of Toamasina since 2010 but served in that see prior to its elevation since 2008.  Pope Francis appointed him a Cardinal in 2018.

Biography
Désiré Tsarahazana was born on 13 June 1954 in Amboangibe in the Sava Region of Madagascar. He studied at the minor seminary in Mahajanga from 1970 to 1976 and then continued his studies at Antsiranana ou Diego-Suarez until 1978, and then prepared for the priesthood from 1979 to 1982 and studied philosophy and theology from 1983 to 1986.

He was ordained a priest on 28 September 1986.

Pope John Paul II appointed him Bishop of Fenoarivo Atsinanana on 30 October 2000
 He was consecrated a bishop on 18 February 2001. He chose as his episcopal motto "" ("Conquer evil with good").

Pope Benedict XVI named him Bishop of Toamasina on 24 November 2008. He became its archbishop when the diocese was raised to the status of archdiocese on 26 February 2010.

He was vice-president of the Episcopal Conference of Madagascar from 2006 to 2012 and since November 2012 he has been its president. That Conference elected him to participate in the 2015 Synod of Bishops on the Family. In February 2018 he took part in a Vatican conference on "Tackling violence committed in the name of religion".

Since 2012 he has led a campaign to make establish a national pilgrimage site in Andevoranto dedicated to Henri de Solages (1786–1832), who is considered the father of Catholicism in Madagascar. A stone church he had constructed was dedicated on 7 December 2014 by the papal nuncio.

In 2013, he denied that employees of Catholic Relief Services (CRS) were promoting contraception in Madagascar as the human overpopulation think tank Population Research Institute charged. He said the reports were based on confusion between government health care workers, whom CRD trains in children's health and malaria prevention, with CRS employees.

Pope Francis made Tsarahazana a cardinal on 28 June 2018, assigning him the titular church of San Gregorio Barbarigo alle Tre Fontane.

In a 2022 interview with Aid to the Church in Need, the archbishop described the state of the Catholic Church in Madagascar as healthy, but in need of a deepening of the faith. "There are many Christians. Most of the dioceses are seeing an increase in the Christian faith, and churches are full. However, I should also mention that ours is a country of great contrasts. We have many resources, but the country is deteriorating. And so, we have to ask ourselves if we are really Christians, if we are living as Jesus taught us, in service to others. This contrast, this difference, worries me. There are Christians, but we need to go deeper in the faith. The faith has to be really lived, and not just practiced outwardly. If we live as Jesus teaches, then we can develop better."

See also
 Cardinals created by Francis
 Catholic Church in Madagascar

References

External links

 
 
 , 6 October 2015 
 

Living people
1944 births
21st-century Roman Catholic archbishops in Madagascar
Cardinals created by Pope Francis
Malagasy cardinals
People from Sava Region
Malagasy Roman Catholic archbishops
Roman Catholic archbishops of Toamasina
Roman Catholic bishops of Fenoarivo Atsinanana
Roman Catholic bishops of Toamasina